Helderberg Nature Reserve is a  nature reserve in Somerset West, South Africa.

This nature reserve is located on the southern slopes of the Helderberg mountains. Its 398 ha consist mostly of “Kogelberg Sandstone Fynbos” (a highly species-rich vegetation type) with smaller patches of “Boland Granite Fynbos” and “Southern Afrotemperate Forest”. Altogether about 600 species of plant have been recorded here, including a wide range of proteas. Particularly prominent plants include the pincushion proteas (Leucospermum sp.), cone bushes (Leucadendron sp.), sugar bushes (Protea sp.), heaths (Erica sp.) and the waboom tree (Protea nitida).

Animals that can be found here include the Cape leopard, caracal, grey duiker, Cape grysbok, steenbok, mongoose, angulate and padloper tortoises and over 170 species of bird.

The reserve has a picnic area, gift shop, Environmental Education Centre and museum displays.

See also
 Biodiversity of Cape Town
 List of nature reserves in Cape Town
 Kogelberg Sandstone Fynbos
 Boland Granite Fynbos
 Index: Fynbos - habitats and species.
 Southern Afrotemperate Forest

External links
 The Helderberg Nature Reserve
 Helderberg Nature Reserve

References

Nature reserves in Cape Town
Fynbos
Renosterveld
Protected areas of the Western Cape